Mary O'Malley (née Hickey 28 July 1918 Mallow, County Cork – 22 April 2006  Booterstown, County Dublin) was an Irish theatre director and, with her husband Pearse, co-founder of Belfast's Lyric Players Theatre, now more usually known as the Lyric Theatre, Belfast.

Life
On 14 September 1947, Mary married Armagh-born doctor Pearse O’Malley in University Church, Dublin and soon afterwards moved to Belfast.

She was elected to Belfast Corporation in May 1952, as an Irish Labour Party councillor for the Smithfield ward.

O'Malley was appointed as an honorary member of the Ulster Society of Women Artists in 1958. In 1959, she founded Threshold literary magazine.

In March 1951, she started Belfast’s Lyric Players Theatre, initially at Ulsterville House and, the following year, in the former stables at the back of her home in Derryvolgie Avenue, off the Malone Road.

In October 1968 a new, purpose-built Lyric Theatre opened on Ridgeway Street. The date of the official opening was chosen by O'Malley as an homage to US President John F. Kennedy's Amherst address, 26 October 1963, in which he affirmed the role of the artist in society.

In 1976, she retired to Wicklow. Her autobiography, Never Shake Hands with the Devil, was published in 1990.

The Lyric Players Theatre archives are held at NUI Galway.

References

External links
"The Lyrical Mary O'Malley", Fortnight, Seamus McKee, No. 11 (19 February 1971), pp. 22–23 

1918 births
2006 deaths
20th-century Irish dramatists and playwrights
20th-century Irish women writers
Artists from Belfast
Irish theatre directors
Irish women dramatists and playwrights
Writers from Belfast
People from Mallow, County Cork
Members of Belfast City Council
Women councillors in Northern Ireland